Harukichi (written: 春吉 or 晴吉) is a masculine Japanese given name. Notable people with the name include:

, Japanese general
, Japanese poet and writer
, Japanese mob boss

Japanese masculine given names